Jeffrey Shawn Swords (born December 27, 1973, in Ottawa, Ontario) is a Canadian basketball coach, and former player. He is currently the head coach of the Laurentian University Voyageurs men's basketball team, and an assistant coach with the Canada U19 men's team.

He played for Canada at the 2000 Summer Olympics.

External links
Shawn Swords @ Sports-Reference

1973 births
Living people
Basketball players at the 1999 Pan American Games
Basketball players at the 2003 Pan American Games
Basketball players at the 2000 Summer Olympics
Canadian expatriate basketball people in France
Canadian men's basketball players
Laurentian Voyageurs basketball players
Olympic basketball players of Canada
Pan American Games competitors for Canada
Basketball players from Ottawa
Besançon BCD players
Brighton Bears players
FC Mulhouse Basket players
2002 FIBA World Championship players
Universiade medalists in basketball
Universiade bronze medalists for Canada
Medalists at the 1995 Summer Universiade